Constructed between the years of 1460 and 1472, the Sauvo church is a medieval stone church located within Sauvo, Finland. A military cemetery exists at the church.

History 
The Sauvo Church was built between the years of 1460 and 1472, although the first historical mention of this church dates back to the year of 1346 from the Turku Cathedral as there have been several wooden churches on this site at the beginning of the 13th century.

Many renovations to the church were made during the 17th century, but the interior of the church is very well-preserved. The mural paintings within said church are from the 15th century and there are several medieval artifacts such as the altar, a triumph crucifix and a tabernacle.

Gallery

References 

Medieval stone churches in Finland
15th-century churches in Finland